The 2008 Iowa House of Representatives election were held on November 4, 2008.  The Iowa House, like the United States House of Representatives, is up for re-election in its entirety every two years.  Prior to the election, the Democrats were in the majority - this marked the first time in 42 years that the Democrats had controlled both branches of the Iowa General Assembly and the Governor's Office.  Democrats retained this majority following the 2008 elections.

House composition

Results
The election took place on November 4, 2008.  Candidate list and official results from the Iowa Secretary of State.

General election

See also
Iowa Senate
Iowa House of Representatives
Iowa Senate elections, 2008
Iowa General Assembly
Political party strength in U.S. states

References

2008
House of Representatives
Iowa